WJBT (93.3 FM "93.3 The Beat") is a commercial radio station licensed to Callahan, Florida, and serving the Jacksonville metropolitan area.  It airs an urban contemporary radio format and is owned by iHeartMedia, Inc.  The studios and offices are on Central Parkway in the Southside neighborhood.

WJBT has an effective radiated power of 100,000 watts, the highest permitted for non-grandfathered FM stations.  The transmitter is off Hogan Road in the Arlington neighborhood.  WJBT broadcasts using HD Radio technology.  The HD2 digital subchannel carries iHeart's Black Information Network, which feeds FM translator W281AM at 104.1 in Macclenny.  The HD3 subchannel airs a simulcast of WSOS-FM, which airs a classic country format.

History of the 93.3 frequency
In 1995, WAIA switched from Triple-A to modern rock, becoming "Planet Radio 93.3".

Station history
WJBT has been in its current format since 1992 (when it was at 92.7), playing Hip Hop and R&B music.  It was home to the nationally syndicated Doug Banks Morning Show (who was replaced with Steve Harvey after its move to 93.3, and later, The Breakfast Club).  Its only other competitor is its own sister station, Urban AC-formatted WSOL-FM. WJBT was the second urban radio station to adopt "The Beat" branding after Los Angeles' KKBT.

When it was at 92.7, it served the Jacksonville area, but it did not have enough power to serve the northernmost and westernmost portions of the metro because its frequency was licensed to Green Cove Springs, Florida.  However, it had no effect on the Arbitron ratings as it is still among the Top 5 (sometimes 10) most listened to stations in the city.

On November 2, 2007, Clear Channel spun off the 92.7 frequency to a private company (which moved the signal to the Palm Coast area as WBHQ) and on the evening of December 25 of that same year, moved the station and its format to the more powerful 93.3 signal (formerly the home of Country outlet WROO). The reason for this was to comply with FCC ownership rules, since WJBT was in a waiver status in which Clear Channel was allowed to own six FMs and one AM in the market. But because of Clear Channel Communications being sold to a private investment group, WJBT's current frequency had to be divested. After Christmas Day 2007, 92.7 and 93.3 were simulcasting. However, on January 11, 2008, a new urban gospel station debuted on the 92.7 frequency named "Hallelujah FM", which is a moniker currently used for many Clear Channel-owned gospel stations nationwide. Also, the call letters were switched, with 92.7 becoming WROO and 93.3 becoming WJBT.

With the move to a more powerful signal, WJBT also received an upgrade in power as well, going from 50 kW to 100 kW, thus covering most of Jacksonville and Northeastern Florida.

On-air personalities
 The Breakfast Club
 Uptown Angela
 T-Roy
 Easy E
 DJ Q45 
 DJ Ian
 Big Sue
 Lil Tree Hugger

Mixers
 DJ Q45
 DJ Dr. Doom

Station management
 Program Director G-Wiz

References

External links
93.3 The Beat Facebook
93.3 The Beat

Urban contemporary radio stations in the United States
JBT
Radio stations established in 1983
IHeartMedia radio stations